The large-toothed Lake Turkana robber (Brycinus ferox) is a species of fish in the family Alestidae. It is endemic to Lake Turkana in Kenya.

References

Brycinus
Fish described in 1982
Endemic freshwater fish of Kenya
Fish of Lake Turkana
Taxonomy articles created by Polbot